The Arizona Hawks were an Amateur Athletic Union-sanctioned Tier II junior ice hockey team based out of Peoria, Arizona. Their host facility was AZ Ice Peoria located next to the Peoria Sports Complex, the spring training home of the Seattle Mariners and San Diego Padres of Major League Baseball. The team was a member of the Western States Hockey League in the Western Division. The team joined the league as an expansion team to start in the 2009–10 season. The players, ages 16–20, carried amateur status under Junior A guidelines and hoped to earn a spot on higher levels of junior ice hockey in the United States and Canada, collegiate, and eventually professional teams.

Luke Hernandez took over as head coach midway through the 2016–17 season. He remained in the role heading into the 2017–18 season but was replaced by Jay Kouris in August 2017.

After three games in the 2017–18 season, the team ceased operations.

Season-by-season records

References

External links
 Official Team Website
 RedHawks Team Website
 Official League Website

Ice hockey teams in Arizona
Sports in Phoenix, Arizona